Joseph Hyungmin Son (born November 22, 1970) is a South Korean-born American convicted felon and a former mixed martial artist, kickboxer, professional wrestler and actor. Prior to his 2008 arrest, he was best known for his appearance in the 1997 film Austin Powers: International Man of Mystery. In 2011, he was sentenced to seven years to life in prison in California for torture committed during a 1990 gang rape. Following beating his cell mate Michael Thomas Graham to death, he was sentenced to an additional 27 years for voluntary manslaughter. He is now serving 34 years to life.

Early life 
Son was born in Gwangju, South Korea. He moved to California at an early age.

Mixed martial arts career
Son was a mixed martial arts fighter and retired with a record of 0–4. Though he had appeared before in Ultimate Fighting Championship's UFC 3 in 1994 as Kimo Leopoldo's cornerman, Son had his proper debut at the UFC 4 event, entering the tournament billed as a taekwondo black belt and founder of a style called "Jo Son Do". He was pitted against kenpo fighter Keith Hackney, whom Son outweighed by 30 pounds, but was seven inches shorter. Son was able to perform a takedown and a guillotine choke attempt, but Hackney countered by punching Son's groin repeatedly, which was legal under the rules of the event. Hackney then performed a blood choke with his fingers and Son tapped out, being eliminated from the tournament.

After his fight in UFC, Son competed in a match for the K-1 kickboxing federation, facing established star Nobuaki Kakuda. The much heavier Son initially led the pace with body shots and knees, scoring a mild knockdown by right hook, but he was eventually knocked out by Kakuda via high kick and punches.

In 2002, Son debuted for Japanese promotion PRIDE Fighting Championships, fighting Takada Dojo exponent Yusuke Imamura at the PRIDE The Best Vol.2. He infamously wore a leopard thong with the PRIDE logo and sported eye makeup, as well as a bowler hat at his entrance, and hugged Imamura during the staredown. The bout was short, and Son quit after he was taken down and almost slid out of the ring, claiming an elbow injury.

On April 12, 2002, Son also took part in Xtreme Pankration 2, wherein he faced Joe Moreira. After a brief exchange of strikes, Moreira landed a hit which drew blood, and Son then refused to continue fighting, and the fight was called. The result was officially listed as "submission (terror)". Son would return to PRIDE in July, facing Jukei Nakajima, and he once again gave up after being injured by being thrown on his head by the Japanese fighter.

Son was also a professional wrestler in Japan for a short time, wrestling Shinya Hashimoto at All Japan Pro Wrestling's second Wrestle-1 event and working as singer and dancer for HUSTLE's third event.

Acting career
Son is best known for his role in the 1997 movie Austin Powers: International Man of Mystery as Random Task, a parody of the James Bond character Odd Job. This was also his final film role. Previously, Son had appeared in several low-budget action films, including Joshua Tree (1993) and Bloodfist V: Human Target (1994).  He played the main villain in the Lorenzo Lamas action film Bad Blood in 1994. He plays a supporting role in Shootfighter: Fight to the Death (1993) and a leading role as the main villain in its sequel Shootfighter II (1996).

Crimes
Joe Son was first arrested for kicking in the door of a roommate's car. He pleaded guilty to felony vandalism on May 16, 2008, whereupon he was sentenced to probation and 60 days in jail. On August 18, 2008, he was taken into custody and given an additional 90 days in jail, due to a probation violation for failing to report to the Department of Probation and keep them informed of his current residence.  As a condition of his original plea agreement, Son was required to provide a DNA sample. In early October 2008, his DNA sample was linked to a gang rape on Christmas Eve, 1990. Already in custody for a probation violation, Son was arrested at the Theo Lacy facility on October 7, 2008.

Son was initially charged in Orange County, California, with five counts of rape, two felony counts of forcible sodomy, two felony counts of sodomy in concert by force, seven felony counts of forcible oral copulation, and one felony count of sexual penetration by foreign object by force. He faced a maximum sentence of 275 years to life if convicted.

Son and an accomplice tortured and repeatedly raped the victim before releasing her with her pants tied around her eyes. During the trial, the woman said that Son told her, "It's Christmas. This is your lucky day." Before jury selection began for his trial in early August 2011, the initial charges against Son were dropped having expired due to the statute of limitations. Son was then charged with conspiracy to commit murder and torture, crimes which have no statute of limitations. In late August, Son was found guilty of one felony count of torture.

During the trial, the Orange County District Attorney's Office maintained that both Son and his co-defendant, Santiago Lopez Gaitan, pistol-whipped their female victim, repeatedly threatened to kill her, and raped her before finally releasing her. Gaitan, 40, pleaded guilty to one felony count each of kidnapping, sodomy by force in concert, rape in concert, forcible oral copulation, and forcible rape with a sentencing enhancement for committing rape while armed with a firearm. He was sentenced January 28, 2011, to 17 years and four months in state prison. On September 19, 2011, Son was sentenced to 7 years to life.

In October 2011, Son was accused of killing his cellmate, Michael Thomas Graham, who was serving two years for failure to register as a sex offender in the county in February. The killing happened on October 10, 2011, on "B" Yard Reception, building 5 at Wasco State Prison. The beating occurred at 5:25 p.m. and Graham died 25 minutes later. After the killing, Son was moved to solitary confinement. On September 13, 2013, Son was charged with Graham's murder. At his trial in 2017, he was found guilty of voluntary manslaughter, and received a 27-year sentence.

Mixed martial arts record 

|-
|Loss
|align=center|0–4
|Jukei Nakajima
|TKO (shoulder injury)
|Pride The Best Vol.2
|
|align=center|1
|align=center|0:54
|Tokyo, Japan
|
|-
|Loss
|align=center|0–3
|Joe Moreira
|Submission (terror)
|Xtreme Pankration 2
|
|align=center|1
|align=center|N/A
|Los Angeles, California, United States
|
|-
|Loss
|align=center|0–2
|Yusuke Imamura
|TKO (elbow injury)
|Pride The Best Vol.1
|
|align=center|1
|align=center|0:33
|Tokyo, Japan
|
|-
|Loss
|align=center|0–1
|Keith Hackney
|Submission (blood choke)
|UFC 4
|
|align=center|1
|align=center|2:44
|Tulsa, Oklahoma, United States
|

Kickboxing record

See also 

 List of male mixed martial artists

References

Notes

External links 
 
 
 
 Joe Son: "You can find me on Wikipedia"

1970 births
Living people
American male kickboxers
20th-century American male actors
American male film actors
American male mixed martial artists
American people convicted of torture
Heavyweight mixed martial artists
Male actors from California
Male erotic dancers
People from the Las Vegas Valley
Prisoners sentenced to life imprisonment by California
South Korean emigrants to the United States
South Korean male film actors
South Korean male kickboxers
South Korean male mixed martial artists
Mixed martial artists utilizing taekwondo
Mixed martial artists utilizing judo
Mixed martial artists utilizing wrestling
Sportspeople from California
Heavyweight kickboxers
Ultimate Fighting Championship male fighters
American people of South Korean descent
Sportspeople convicted of murder